The class 96 (MS96 in Dutch, AM96 in French) is an electric multiple unit constructed in 1996 for the National Railway Company of Belgium. 

They incorporate features from the DSB IC3 trainsets in order to enable passage from one set coach to another. When two or more units are coupled together in a single train, the entire front door folds away to give a wide passage, and the rubber diaphragms at the ends form a flush aerodynamic seal.

As of summer 2022, these trainsets are used almost exclusively on IC connections:

 IC-03: Blankenberge - Brussels - Sint-Truiden - Genk
 IC-04: Antwerp Central - Kortrijk - Poperinge / Lille-Flandres (F)
 IC-06: Tournai - Brussels - Brussels Airport
 IC-06A: Mons - Brussels - Brussels Airport
 IC-13 Kortrijk - Zottegem - Denderleeuw - Brussels - Schaarbeek
 IC-18: Brussels - Namur - Liège-Saint-Lambert
 IC-19: Namur - Tournai - Lille-Flandres (F)
 IC-23: Ostend - Kortrijk - Zottegem - Brussels - Brussels Airport
 IC-23A: Knokke - Brussels - Brussels Airport
 IC-25: Mons - Namur - Liège-Saint-Lambert
 IC-29: Ghent - Aalst - Brussels - Brussels Airport - Landen
 IC-32: Kortrijk - Bruges (routes 805, 821, 841)
 IC-41: Namur - Charleroi - Maubeuge (F)
 IC-42: Mons - Aulnoye-Aymeries (F)

The MS96 also runs a limited number of P trains, L trains and S trains.

Gallery

Interior

Accidents and incidents

Three people were killed and about 40 were injured. Unit 548 was at the front of the train, unit 461 was at the rear of the train.

On 27 November 2017, Unit 449 collided with a car on a level crossing at Morlanwelz and was damaged by the consequent fire. It was the leading unit of a train formed of units 449 and 442. During recovery operations, the unit broke free from the train and ran away, killing two people and seriously injuring two more. Five people were injured in that collision.

References

SNCB multiple units
Electric multiple units of Belgium
3000 V DC multiple units
25 kV AC multiple units
Bombardier Transportation multiple units